Malemort-sur-Corrèze (Limousin: Malamòrt) is a former commune in the Corrèze department in central France. On 1 January 2016, it was merged into the new commune Malemort.

The Battle of Malemort was fought there on 21 April 1177.

Population

See also
Communes of the Corrèze department
Malemort-Lafont station, a former railway station

References

External links

Official site

Former communes of Corrèze
Populated places disestablished in 2016